The Cambridge University Association Football League (CUAFL) is the governing body of football in the University of Cambridge in England.

Introduction
Modern football was developed on the playing fields of public schools and universities in the late 19th century, thus it is only natural that the University of Cambridge should have a flourishing football league. It is because of this early influence on the game that The FA granted the university a seat on The FA Council, a position retained to this day. This gives Cambridge University county status (separate from Cambridgeshire), with the same voice in English football's governing body as such associations as London, the Army and Women's football.

History

Origins of collegiate football
Football in Cambridge was being played on Parker's Piece as far back as the 1830s. However it was not until 1855 that the university had a formal football club, Cambridge University Association Football Club, making it one of the oldest clubs in the world. Collegiate football helped spread the game in the 1870s, and the first competition for these teams was held in 1882–1883. The format was a knockout tournament based on the FA Challenge Cup, which had been created in 1871. The first entrants included nine colleges (Caius, St. John's, Clare, St. Catharine's, Pembroke, Sidney, Jesus, King's and Trinity Hall) and three old boys sides (Old Harrovians, Trinity Etonians and Trinity Rest). It is likely that the university, quick to follow The FA in hosting a cup competition, also soon followed the idea of William McGregor, the founder of The Football League, by creating the Cambridge University Association Football League.

The Modern Era
For the 2006–2007 season, the number of teams in the league reached 78, and in the 2007–2008 season, 31 clubs and 75 teams entered CUAFL competitions. This means that at least 800 people play college football each season, however this is a very conservative estimate.

Competitions

CUAFL organises Seven divisions as well as four cup competitions, 'Cuppers' and the Plate for first teams, the Shield for second teams and the Vase for lower teams.

Cuppers is a knockout tournament with pairings drawn completely at random at the first captain's meeting of the season. There are no seeds and byes are only awarded if the number of entrants requires them. The final is contested the neutral venue of Grange Road. The competition starts in the fourth week of Michaelmas term. In 2004–2005, 31 teams entered the competition, including 26 full colleges, one college affiliated to the university, two local schools, and Cambridge's other university, ARU. To be eligible for entry, teams must be affiliated to CUAFL. Each club may only enter one team, which must be their 1st team. There are five rounds in total.

Cuppers was first contested in 1882–1883. The first entrants included nine colleges (Caius, St. John's, Clare, St. Catharine's, Pembroke, Sidney, Jesus, King's and Trinity Hall) and three old boys sides (Old Harrovians, Trinity Etonians and Trinity Rest).

The Plate competition is for teams that have been knocked out in the first round.

In recent years, when St. Catharine's College has been victorious in Cuppers they have challenged the Oxford University Cuppers Champions to a one-off "Supercuppers" match. In 2007, they defeated Brasenose College Oxford 3–2 (after extra time) in a match held at St. Catharine's Sports Fields, Cambridge. In 2009, they played St. John's College Oxford at Iffley Road, Oxford, and again were victorious 3–2.

Girton College went mixed in 1976 and the first male under-graduates arrived in October 1979. The college started playing in the college league, in division 5, for the first time in the 1980–81 season and won two successive promotions. In season 1986–87, with two blues players, Chris Elliott and Ian McKinnon, they made it through to the semi finals of Cuppers, losing narrowly in extra time to Downing. By 1993–94, they made it to the top division and in 1997–98, they were crowned league champions for the first time, a feat they repeated in 2003–04. In 1995 they won Cuppers for the only time in their history, beating APU in the final. Since then they have been Cuppers Runners up on 5 occasions, in 1999, 2001, 2003, 2008 and 2018.

Since 2014, Homerton College and Gonville & Caius College, the only two colleges with fourth teams that year, have competed for the Bucket in an annual informal 'cup' match. Homerton College won the inaugural contest 1–0. As of 2021, Gonville & Caius College hold the Bucket.

Results

The results of the principal competitions are shown below.

The combined results of the Cuppers competition is shown below.

Board of directors

CUAFL President:  Dr John Little

References

External links
 Cambridge University Association Football League
 University of Cambridge
 University of Cambridge Sport

County football associations
Football
Sports organizations established in 1855
Football in Cambridgeshire
1855 establishments in England